The 2010 TUMS Fast Relief 500 was a NASCAR Sprint Cup Series stock car race that was held on October 24, 2010, at Martinsville Speedway in Martinsville, Virginia. It was contested over 500 laps, and was the thirty-second race of the season and the sixth race in the season-ending Chase for the Sprint Cup for the 2010 NASCAR Sprint Cup Series. The race was won by Denny Hamlin for the Joe Gibbs Racing team. Mark Martin driving for Hendrick Motorsports finished second and Richard Childress Racing's Kevin Harvick , who started thirty-sixth, came third.

During the race there were fifteen cautions and twenty-four lead changes among thirteen drivers. It was Hamlin's seventh win in the 2010 season and the fifteenth of his career. The result left him second in the Drivers' Championship, six points behind Jimmie Johnson. Chevrolet maintained its lead in the Manufacturers' Championship, forty-two ahead of Toyota and eighty-seven ahead of Ford, with four races remaining in the season.

Report

Background 

Martinsville Speedway is one of five short tracks that holds NASCAR races; the others are Richmond Raceway, Dover International Speedway, Bristol Motor Speedway, and ISM Raceway. The track's turns are banked at eleven degrees while the front stretch, the location of the finish line, is banked at zero degrees. The back stretch also has zero-degree banking. The racetrack can accommodate 63,000 spectators.

Before the race, Jimmie Johnson led the Drivers' Championship with 5,843 points whereas Denny Hamlin stood in second place with 5,802 points. Third-placed Kevin Harvick had 5,766 points, seventy-nine ahead of the fourth-placed Jeff Gordon and hundred ahead of the fifth-placed Kyle Busch. Tony Stewart in sixth with 5,666 points, was twenty-three points ahead of Carl Edwards and Greg Biffle with 5,618 points was twelve ahead of Kurt Busch, and fourteen in front of Jeff Burton. Matt Kenseth and Clint Bowyer were eleventh and twelfth places with 5,587 and 5,543 points, respectively . In the Manufacturers' Championship, Chevrolet led with 230 points, forty-five points ahead of their rival Toyota. Ford, with 145 points, was twenty-three points ahead of Dodge in the battle for third place. Hamlin was the race's defending champion after winning it in 2009.

Practice and qualifying 

Three practice sessions were held before the Saturday race—one on Friday and two on Saturday. The first session lasted ninety minutes, the second session lasted forty-five minutes, while the third and final session lasted sixty minutes. During the first practice session, Stewart, who was racing for the Stewart Haas Racing team, was the quickest ahead of Hamlin in the second position and Juan Pablo Montoya in the third position. Biffle came in fourth and David Reutimann finished fifth. Bowyer, David Ragan, A. J. Allmendinger, Gordon, and Joey Logano in that order rounded out the ten drivers who were quickest in the session.

After the practice sessions during qualification, forty-eight cars were entered but only forty-three was able to race because of NASCAR's qualifying procedure. Hamlin clinched the ninth pole position of his career with a time of 19.518 seconds. He was joined on the front row of the grid by Marcos Ambrose. Biffle qualified third, Ryan Newman took fourth, and Montoya started fifth. Johnson, one of the drivers in the Chase for the Sprint Cup, qualified nineteenth while Harvick was scored thirty-sixth. Michael McDowell, Johnny Sauter, Robby Gordon, and Terry Cook failed to qualify for the race while Dennis Setzer withdrew from qualifying. Once the qualifying session was completed, Hamlin commented:

We spent all day working on qualifying trying to get the pole—trying to get that first pit stall because obviously we do feel like it's very important. I think if I’m ahead of the 48 then I could possibly set the tone in whether he leads a lap or not. That's a 10-point swing. That's a little bit of it. It all starts today and that's where our strategy's at. Other than that, I plan on trying to go out there and lead the most laps and win the race—just like everyone else is.

The next morning, Brad Keselowski was the quickest in the second practice session, ahead of Bowyer in the second place and Harvick in the third place. Allmendinger was the fourth quickest, and Ambrose finished fifth. Burton, Jamie McMurray, Bobby Labonte, Ragan, and Johnson followed in the top ten in that order. Carl Edwards was twenty-sixth and Kyle Busch was twenty-seventh. During the third and final practice session, Biffle was the quickest with the fastest time of 19.799 seconds. Burton and Bowyer followed in second and third places with times of 19.866 and 19.867 seconds respectively. McMurray was the fourth fastest driver ahead of Harvick, who finished fifth, and Johnson, who finished sixth. Gordon finished seventh, Hamlin took eighth, Aric Almirola was ninth, and Mark Martin was tenth.

Race 
The race, the thirty-second of thirty-six in the season, began at 1:00 p.m. Eastern Daylight Time (EDT) and was televised live in the United States on ESPN. Eddie Barton of Raceway Ministries began the pre-race ceremonies with an invocation. Next, Winston-Salem State University's Marching Band performed the national anthem and each of the race teams' pit crews gave the command for drivers to start their engines. Before the pace laps, Robby Gordon replaced Kevin Conway in the 7 car.

Denny Hamlin accelerated from the start line more quickly than Marcos Ambrose, getting ahead of him down the front straightaway. After starting fifth, Juan Pablo Montoya had fallen to seventh by lap 5. Montoya continued to lose positions and had fallen to 11th as Jeff Gordon took over the eighth position from Carl Edwards. On lap 11, Ambrose became the leader after passing Hamlin. Two laps later, Hamlin had fallen to fourth after being passed by Biffle and Newman, while Tony Stewart fell to eighth position. By lap 21, Ambrose had a 0.9 second lead over the second position. After starting thirty-sixth, Kevin Harvick had moved to twenty-seventh by lap 23. Hamlin continued to lose positions, dropping back to eleventh in less than thirteen laps. Landon Cassill drove to the garage because of problems with his car's brakes on lap 28. Four laps later, Jimmie Johnson took over thirteenth after passing Scott Speed. Seven laps later, Harvick had moved up to the 20th position. On lap 46, David Gilliland took his car to the garage. On the next lap Travis Kvapil's tire blew and he crashed into the wall and brought out the first caution of the race. Tony Raines won the free pass under caution. The leading cars made a pit stop during the caution.

Casey Mears stayed out and assumed the lead of the race. He made a pit stop on the next lap and handed the lead to Ryan Newman, who won the race off pit road. Jamie McMurray and David Ragan were caught for speeding on pit road and restarted at the back of the field. Newman led the field to the green on the lap 53 restart. By lap 60, Harvick had moved into the eighth position. Three laps later, Jeff Burton passed Biffle for fourth. On the next lap Hamlin passed Stewart for the tenth position. Three laps later, Burton continued to move up the field by passing Ambrose for the third position. On lap 77, Dave Blaney took his car to the garage because of problems with its brakes. Two laps later, Burton passed David Reutimann for the second position. Three laps later, he passed Ryan Newman for the lead of the race. Eight laps later, Reutimann passed Newman for the second position. On lap 104, Hamlin passed Harvick for the fifth position. Hamlin continued to move up the field by passing Ambrose for the fourth position, six laps later. On the next lap, the second caution of the race came out for Elliott Sadler, who spun out in turn two. He was also held for two laps for intentionally causing the caution. Robby Gordon won the free pass under caution.

Most of the cars made a pit stop to change tires and refuel. Brad Keselowski was caught speeding on the pit road and restarted at the back of the field. Burton, who retained the lead throughout the cycle of pit stops, led the field to the green flag on the lap 116 restart. Two laps later, Johnson passed Ambrose for the ninth position. On the next lap, the third caution of the race came out for Ambrose, who blew out a tire and hit a wall after making contact with Johnson. Kurt Busch and Martin Truex Jr. made pit stops under caution as did Ambrose, who stayed on the lead lap despite making multiple pit stops. Burton led the field to the green flag on the lap 126 restart. Newman passed Burton for the lead on the next lap. Burton retook the lead on the next lap and started to pull away. Four laps later, the fourth caution came out for Ken Schrader, who spun on the backstretch after being tapped by Casey Mears, who won the free pass under the caution. Several cars made pit stops while the first fourteen cars elected to stay out. The green flag waved for the restart on lap 137 with Jeff Burton in the lead.

On the next lap, Harvick passed Reutimann for the third position. Seven laps later, Harvick passed Newman for second as Jeff Gordon moved past Biffle for the eighth position. On lap 151, Clint Bowyer passed Biffle for the tenth position. Two laps later, Truex Jr. made an unscheduled pit stop that put him multiple laps down. On lap 170, the fifth caution of the race came out for Truex, who stopped at the entrance of the pit road. Tony Raines won the free pass for the third time under this caution. Most cars made pit stops under the caution to refuel and get fresh tires. Tony Stewart was caught speeding on the pit road and restarted at the back of the field while Greg Biffle had to make two pit stops to replace a lug nut that was missing from his car. Burton won the race off the pit road and led the field back to the green flag on lap 176. By lap 181, Newman had fallen to the sixth position as Reutimann and Johnson passed him. Four laps later, the sixth caution came out for Regan Smith, who spun out and hit the wall. Ken Schrader won the free pass under the caution. Most of the cars opted to stay out while McMurray, Stewart, Scott Speed, Sam Hornish Jr., and Mears made pit stops under caution. Burton continued to lead as he led the field to the green flag on the lap 200 restart. Hamlin moved past Harvick for the second position on the next lap. Two laps later, the seventh caution came out for Bowyer, who spun and hit the wall in Turn 4. Hermie Sadler won the free pass under the caution. Biffle, Ambrose, Hornish, and Robby Gordon made pit stops as most of the cars opted to stay out. Burton restarted in the lead on lap 200. Three laps later, Dale Earnhardt Jr. passed Newman for the sixth position. On lap 205, Harvick re-passed Denny Hamlin for the second position. Four laps later, the eighth caution of the race came out for Paul Menard, who spun after he was bumped by Aric Almirola. Hermie Sadler again received the free pass and went back onto the lead lap. Several drivers including Earnhardt Jr. and Carl Edwards made pit stops under caution. Greg Biffle received a penalty for having too many men over the wall and restarted at the back of the field.

Burton led the field to the green flag on the lap 214 restart but on the next lap he was passed by his teammate Harvick. Burton retook the lead from Harvick seven laps later. On lap 224, Stewart passed Kurt Busch for the tenth position. On the next lap, the ninth caution came out for Mark Martin, who crashed into the wall on the front stretch after being bumped by A. J. Allmendinger. J. J. Yeley received the free pass under caution. The leaders made pit stops under the caution while thirteen cars stayed out. Jeff Gordon led the field to the green flag on lap 232. On the next lap, the tenth caution was brought out by Reutimann, who spun and hit the wall after making contact with Brad Keselowski. Scott Speed received the free pass under this caution. Gordon led the field to the green flag on lap 246. Two laps later, Mark Martin made a pit stop to replace a flat tire and went two laps down. On lap 250, Newman took his car to the garage because he lost his rear gear. Six laps later, Stewart claimed the fourth position by passing Montoya. On lap 258, Earnhardt Jr. passed Kyle Busch for the fourth position. Two laps later, Burton and Johnson passed David Ragan for tenth and eleventh places, respectively. On lap 271, Joe Nemechek took his car, which had a problem with its brakes, top the garage. Two laps later, Burton had moved up to the fifth position. On lap 285, Earnhardt Jr. passed Gordon for the lead. Two laps later, the eleventh caution of the race came out for Yeley, who had stopped on the backstretch because his car had a brake problem. Most of the leading cars made a pit stop during the caution period. Robby Gordon stayed out to lead a lap. He pitted two laps later and handed the lead to Earnhardt Jr., who led the field to the green flag on lap 293. Four laps later, Jeff Gordon passed Stewart for the second position as Burton passed Kyle Busch for the fourth position.

On lap 305, Ambrose got loose, spun, and hit Sam Hornish Jr., sending both cars into the outside wall. The caution did not come out because both of them safely returned to the pit road. On the same lap, Robby Gordon had a flat tire and made a pit stop. By lap 312, Burton had moved up to the third position. Five laps later, he passed Jeff Gordon on the backstretch for the second position. On lap 331, Hamlin passed Johnson for the eighth position. Two laps later, Kyle Busch passed Stewart for the fourth position. On lap 348, the twelfth caution came out for Biffle, who spun out with a flat tire. The leading cars made a pit stop to refuel and replace their tires. Earnhardt Jr. led the field to the green flag for the restart on lap 356. Two laps later, the thirteenth caution came out for Sam Hornish Jr., who spun and hit the wall. Earnhardt Jr. continued to lead as he led the field to the green flag on lap 363. Five laps later, Harvick passed Burton for the second position. On lap 373, Hamlin passed Edwards for the seventh position. Five laps later, Harvick passed Earnhardt Jr. for the lead in turn 1. By lap 382, Earnhardt Jr. had fallen to the fourth position because he had been passed by Burton and Johnson. Two laps later, the fourteenth caution came out for Jeff Gordon, who had bumped Kurt Busch, who retaliated by spinning Gordon out on the front stretch on the next lap.

Mark Martin won the free pass under caution and got back onto the lead lap. Ken Schrader stayed out and assumed the lead as the lead cars made a pit stop. He led the field to the green flag on lap 393 but Harvick on fresh tires quickly passed him on the next lap. The fifteenth and final caution of the race came out on lap 396 when Tony Raines had a flat tire and spun in turn four. Jeff Gordon got the free pass under caution and got back on the lead lap. Gordon, Allmendinger and Hornish made pit stops under caution as Kevin Harvick led the field to the green flag on the lap 402 restart. On the next lap, Burton passed Hamlin for the second position. On lap 422, Mark Martin passed Kurt Busch for the twelfth position. Two laps later, he passed Montoya for 11th. By lap 437 Martin had moved up to the ninth position. Four laps later, he passed Edwards for the eighth position. On lap 456, Hamlin re-passed Burton for the second position. Eight laps later, Martin passed Earnhardt Jr. for the seventh position. On lap 472, Hamlin took the lead by passing Harvick. By lap 481, Martin had moved up to the fourth position, passing Kyle Busch. Five laps later, he passed Burton for the third position. On lap 492, Ambrose had a flat tire but made it safely to the pit road. With four laps remaining, Martin passed Harvick for the second position as Hamlin had built a two-second advantage over the second place that he retained to the end and won his third consecutive race at Martinsville, and his seventh of the season.

Results

Qualifying

Race results

Standings after the race 

Note: Only the top twelve positions are included for the driver standings. These drivers qualified for the Chase for the Sprint Cup.

References 

2010 in sports in Virginia
2010 NASCAR Sprint Cup Series
2010 TUMS Fast Relief 500
October 2010 sports events in the United States